David Blumer (born 26 February 1986) is a Swiss footballer.

Life and career
In May 2010, he was banned from football for 24 months, which he was involved in 2009 European football betting scandal. His former teammate Pape Omar Fayé and Eldar Ikanović were also banned.

International career
Blumer made his U21 debut on 15 November 2006, a friendly against Slovenia U21. He played all 6 caps in friendly match.

References

External links
 Football.ch profile
 

Swiss men's footballers
Switzerland under-21 international footballers
Grasshopper Club Zürich players
FC Thun players
FC Wil players
Swiss Super League players
Swiss Challenge League players
Association football forwards
1986 births
Living people